The Sandbach Concert Series is a series of eight monthly concerts per year, that takes place in Sandbach, Cheshire. Each event begins with a Spotlight Concert that showcases a number of young musicians from local schools, before the main concert featuring professional musicians. There is also an art exhibition, and raffle raising money for charitable causes. There have been over 50 concerts to date.

History
The Concert Series was conceived by harpist Lauren Scott and co-founded  in 2010 with her husband, the composer and saxophonist Andy Scott as Musical Director. Following a presentation to the local Council in July 2010, funding was secured from Sandbach Town Council, Cheshire East Council, and Arts Council England with the National Lottery, and the first concert debuted on the evening of Wednesday 29 September 2010. The concert is non-profit making, and run by volunteers. In 2016, the organisation became a registered charity.

Sandbach Young Musician of the Year
In 2015, the Concert Series launched the Sandbach Young Musician of the Year, an annual competition "open to individual performers aged 19 and under who have performed at one of the Sandbach Concert Series Spotlight concerts during the previous calendar year". The first final was held on 18 April 2015 at Sandbach Town Hall during the annual Sandbach Transport Festival. The competition was won by Alex Flanders, with prizes awarded by Sandbach Mayor Elsie Alcock.

Performers
Notable performers have included Craig Ogden, Chris Stout & Catriona McKay, Gwilym Simcock, Paul Edmund-Davies, Bramwell Tovey, Linda Richardson, and Tina May and pianist Nikki Ile.

References

2010 establishments in England
Classical music festivals in England
Music festivals in Cheshire
Music festivals established in 2010
Sandbach